Roosevelt Theodore Nix (born April 17, 1967) is a former American football defensive end who played three seasons in the National Football League with the Cincinnati Bengals and Minnesota Vikings. Nix attended Scott High School in Toledo, Ohio, and first enrolled at the College of DuPage before transferring to Central State University. He was then drafted by the Bengals in the eighth round of the 1992 NFL Draft. Nix was also a member of the Green Bay Packers and Arizona Cardinals of the NFL, and Minnesota Fighting Pike, New York CityHawks and New England Sea Wolves of the Arena Football League (AFL).

College career
Nix first played college football for the College of DuPage Chaparrals. Nix transferred from the College of DuPage to play one season for the Central State Marauders.

Professional career
Nix was selected by the Cincinnati Bengals with the 199th pick in the 1992 NFL Draft. He played in sixteen games for the Bengals from 1992 to 1993. He played in two games for the Minnesota Vikings during the 1994 season. He was signed by the Green Bay Packers on March 27, 1995. He was released by the Packers on April 27, 1995. Nix signed with the Arizona Cardinals on June 2, 1995.

Nix was signed by the Minnesota Fighting Pike on May 2, 1996 and played for the team during the 1996 season. He played for the New York CityHawks from 1997 to 1998. He was traded to the Tampa Bay Storm for Kent Wells on June 18, 1997 but the trade was nixed when Wells failed to pass his physical. He was a member of the New England Sea Wolves during the 1999 off-season. He was released by the Sea Wolves on February 23, 1999.

Personal life
Nix has been arrested and cited in the past for failing to make child support payments.

His son, Roosevelt Nix, is an NFL fullback.

References

External links
Just Sports Stats

Living people
1967 births
Players of American football from Ohio
American football defensive ends
African-American players of American football
Central State Marauders football players
Cincinnati Bengals players
Minnesota Vikings players
Minnesota Fighting Pike players
New York CityHawks players
Sportspeople from Toledo, Ohio
College of DuPage Chaparrals football players
21st-century African-American people
20th-century African-American sportspeople